Tom Snikkers (born December 20, 1990) is an American-Dutch retired basketball player who played collegiate for the Calvin Knights where he was a starter all four years. He was awarded First Team All-Conference his final three seasons at Calvin, and was awarded All-American honors during his senior campaign. Tom went on to play one season for Aris Leeuwarden of the Dutch Basketball League (DBL).

Career
For the 2013–14 Snikkers signed with Aris Leeuwarden. After his first professional season, Snikkers retired.

Honors
Calvin College
MIAA All-Conference Team (3): 2011, 2012, 2013
Aris Leeuwarden
DBL All-Rookie Team: 2014

References

1990 births
Living people
American expatriate basketball people in the Netherlands
American men's basketball players
Aris Leeuwarden players
Basketball players from Michigan
Calvin Knights men's basketball players
Dutch Basketball League players
Dutch men's basketball players
People from Hudsonville, Michigan
Small forwards